Jammed finger is a colloquialism referring to a variety of injuries to the joints of the fingers, resulting from axial loading beyond that which the ligaments can withstand. Common parts of the finger susceptible to this type of injury are ligaments, joints, and bones. The severity of the damage to the finger increases with the magnitude of the force exerted by the external object on the fingertip. Toes may become jammed as well, with similar results.

Signs and symptoms 
There are a number of possible signs which indicate a jammed finger, which vary depending on the severity of the injury. These include swelling, reduction of flexibility of joints, pain, and tenderness. There may also be discolouration of the skin due to bruising. These symptoms may persist for up to eight weeks. Initial signs of a dislocation include abnormal joint angulation (bones pointing at abnormal angles from a joint), while more serious fractures are indicated by midshaft angulation and rotation, where the bone itself appears broken or twisted.

Causes 
Jammed fingers can occur when a force is applied in direction of the length of the finger from the fingertip (axial loading). Therefore, any recreational activity in which the fingers are held in an outstretched position has the possibility of resulting in a jammed finger. This type of injury is particularly common in ball related sports, where an incorrect catching method may lead to the ball making contact with the tip of the finger. They may also occur if the finger is crushed between two surfaces, such as a door and door frame.

Diagnosis 

A jammed finger can generally be diagnosed via physical examination. The relative position of the bones of the finger give an indication as to potential dislocations or fractures. However, it is recommended to seek medical attention regardless of whether or not a dislocation or fracture is evident. This is because untreated jammed fingers can lead to future pain and stiffness, with joint surface fractures increasing the risk of arthritis. The areas around the injury may be palpated in order to ascertain the areas of maximum pain. If the injury is a joint injury (namely a sprain or dislocation), the point of maximum pain will be close to the joint rather than mid-phalanx (mid-bone). Due to the risk of dislocations or fractures, stability testing is not recommended until after an x-ray has been conducted and the presence of a dislocation or fracture has been confirmed or rejected. In extremely painful cases, a digital nerve block, where anaesthetic is injected in the web to either side of the affected finger, may be employed to enable assessment of the injury. X-rays may be employed to achieve a more accurate diagnosis of a jammed finger, enabling the identification of varying types of dislocation or fractures. In order to account for all possibilities, it is recommended that a variety of views (lateral, oblique, and anteroposterior) are observed.

A jammed finger can be split into three categories; a sprain, a dislocation, or a fracture. Sprains can be further split into three sub-categories based on severity (first, second and third degree sprains in order of increasing severity). First degree sprains involve a stretching of the ligament, without a tear. Second degree sprains involve a partial tear of the ligament, while third degree sprains are complete tears of the ligament. Third degree sprains commonly result in a dislocation of the finger. Sprains are characterised by swelling of the joint, reduced range of motion, and pain.

Dislocations can be categorised based on location and type. The finger can be split into three bones and two joints in an alternating order. From the fingertip to the knuckle, these are as follows; distal phalanx, distal inter-phalangeal (DIP) joint, middle phalanx, proximal inter-phalangeal (PIP) joint, and proximal phalanx. DIP dislocations are much less common than PIP dislocations, due to the "stability provided by strong collateral ligaments, palmar plates, and tendinous insertions, as well as the short lever arm of the distal phalanx". Dislocations can be categorised based on the direction that the fingertip moves in relation to the knuckle, be it in the direction of the palm (volar dislocation), or the direction of the back of the hand (dorsal dislocation). Of the two, dorsal dislocations are more common. If reduction has been attempted, an x-ray of the dislocation should appear concentric if successful. However, if there is a fracture present, there will be a misalignment of the joint, which will be evident from the radiograph. Bach suggests a referral to a hand surgeon if a misalignment is present.

Fractures are instances where the bone's structural integrity has been compromised. This is indicated by midshaft pain, as well as visual midshaft angulation or rotation. As with any skeletal injury, an x-ray can be conducted to verify the presence of a fracture. The distal phalanx is especially vulnerable to avulsion fractures, where a fragment of bone is ripped off when the tendon separates from the phalanx. Avulsion fractures are especially common following a first time dislocation. These are especially concerning, as it may indicate a complete tear of the extensor digitorum tendon. If left untreated, this may lead to permanent DIP extensor lag (inability to fully straighten the finger).

A variation of the jammed finger where the extensor tendons on the back of the fingers are damaged is known as 'mallet finger'. Mallet fingers are caused by the same finger trauma as jammed fingers, and are characterised by a difficulty extending the finger or opening the hand. They may also exhibit other symptoms common to jammed fingers such as swelling, pain, and tenderness.

Treatment 

For first and second degree sprains, the ligaments have not been completely ruptured. In these cases, the RICE method is the recommended option. RICE stands for Rest, Ice, Compression, and Elevation, and the method aims to reduce bleeding into the location of the injury to reduce swelling. The method is as follows;

Rest 
The injured extremity should be rested and not put to use immediately following the injury. This reduces the likelihood of further retraction of muscle stumps, which can lead to 'holes' in the muscle. Additionally, the size of the haematoma decreases as well as the connective tissue scar.

Ice 
Early use of cold therapy (cryotherapy) reduces the swelling around the injured area, as well as reducing haematoma size. It has also been associated with accelerated early regeneration compared to injuries that were not iced directly after occurring. Icing of the injury should be applied in stretches of 15–20 minutes every 30–60 minutes for around six hours. However, the pioneer of the RICE method Gabe Mirkin now suggests that cryotherapy should only be employed if the pain is unbearable, as some studies suggest that cryotherapy may delay healing

Compression 
Compressing the injury reduces intramuscular blood flow due to the constriction of veins and arteries, reducing haematoma size. However, there is still debate as to whether it accelerates the healing process.

Elevation 
Finally, elevation of the affected area above the heart reduces the blood flow to the injured region due to the difference in hydrostatic pressure between the finger and the heart. This has similar effects to the first three components of the method.

Following the implementation of this method, splinting is recommended to keep the digit immobile. The skin under the splint should be carefully observed during the duration of its use due to the number of complications that can arise, including ulceration, maceration, and tape allergy. When removing the splint to assess the skin underneath, it is important that the digit remain in the splinted position. These complications can be reduced by including a layer of tubular gauze or a moleskin lining between the splint and the skin of the finger. If no splints are easily available, buddy taping can be employed. This is where the affected digit is taped to an adjacent finger to provide support. This limiting of motion helps to reduce ligament stress, which is important in the early stages of healing. If swelling persists, anti-inflammatory medications may be prescribed.

A third degree sprain often results in a dislocation. Volar and dorsal dislocations are treated differently, and treatment should be withheld if a fracture is suspected. In the case of a dislocation, closed reduction can be attempted. This is where the joint is realigned without the need for surgery, and can be conducted immediately after the incident. For a dorsal dislocation, reduction should be conducted by undertaking distal traction of the fingertip, then applying volar pressure to the phalanx in the distal direction of the dislocated joint, and dorsal pressure to the other phalanx. Ensure that the joint can be moved with no pain. After this, a splint at a small bend is employed to maintain slight flexion and prevent hyper-extension of the joint for the next week. If hyper-extension of the joint is too painful or causes skin blanching, the joint may be placed in a neutral position. Limited movement of the affected digit is recommended to occur soon after the injury to limit loss of range of motion. This may only include small degrees of flexion, depending on the severity of the injury. For volar dislocations, reduction should be conducted by undertaking distal traction of the fingertip, then applying distal pressure to the phalanx in the distal direction of the dislocated joint, and volar pressure to the other phalanx. Unlike dorsal dislocations, after performing reduction on a volar dislocation, the joint must remain splinted at full extension. After reduction, tendons may be tested through active flexion and extension. Due to swelling and pain, a full range of motion is unlikely to occur, however if no active flexion or extension can be done, it indicates a high possibility of a tendon rupture. If no avulsion fracture is present, the splint should be in place for four to six weeks to allow the torn central slip to heal in the correct location, with an additional four to six weeks splinting during sporting activities. If there is an avulsion fracture involving more than thirty percent of joint space, an orthopedic surgeon should be consulted, as open reduction and internal fixation may be required. If the dislocation does not reduce easily, it may be necessary to administer local anaesthetic, or in extreme cases open reduction may be required. There are currently four causes of an irreducible DIP joint dislocation, brought about by an anatomic block, where there is difficulty accessing parts of the finger. These causes are: "a palmar plate avulsion off the middle phalanx with interposition in the joint, entrapment of the flexor digitorum profundus (FDP) tendon behind one condyle of the middle phalanx, button-hole tear through the palmar plate, and entrapment of the distal end of the middle phalanx in a longitudinal split in the FDP tendon". Any of these cases will require open reduction, conducted under anesthetic. Following open reduction, the joint should be immobilised for two to four weeks in a splint, after which exercises may be performed to achieve joint stability. Pooled literature suggests that the initial treatment of jammed fingers should be conservative, without open reduction. Damron and colleagues suggest an approach that only requires open surgery for the cause listed above, and cases where after six months observation conservative treatment has failed. This approach is suggested due to the relative cost efficiency of conservative treatment, as there are fewer office visits, a single x-ray, and inexpensive splint materials compared to open surgery which requires multiple appointments, professional costs of surgery, as well as anaesthetic.

Fractures involve the breaking of the bone. As such, it is recommended that medical attention is sought, so as to avoid the bone healing with a malunion, which may result in post-traumatic arthritis. Additional surgery may need to be conducted to properly treat a malunion. As with a dislocation, closed reduction is attempted before open reduction. The finger is then splinted to prevent further injury to the digit as it heals. A number of splints have been proposed for jammed fingers, depending on the reduction conducted. These include taping, Stack splint, padded aluminum malleable splint, Piplex splint, elastic double finger bandage, perforated plastic splint, molded polythene splint, and Abouna splint. However, the type of splint is less important than patient compliance with the use and time spend with the splint. Splinting for less than the recommended duration may lead to less effective healing, a loss of function, and permanent extensor lag.

In any of the above cases, depending on severity, stretching and strengthening programmes may be required in the rehabilitation stage. Range of motion exercises are required to prevent stiffness in addition to potentially long term loss of range of motion of the affected digit. Digital edema-control techniques will reduce the time taken to regain range of motion. Examples of such techniques include massage and compressive wraps. An increased amount of swelling during the rehabilitation period is indicative of an undiagnosed fracture or an overly aggressive rehabilitation programme.

Prevention 
Due to the unpredictable nature of suffering a jammed finger, it is difficult to prevent such an injury from occurring without obstructing day-to-day activities. The majority of jammed fingers occur in the dominant hand, possibly due to the fact that most activities are conducted with this hand. However, it is possible to prevent specific cases, such as suffering a jammed finger by incorrectly catching a ball, by learning the proper technique. It has been recommended that the affected finger be taped to prevent the same injury from occurring when conducting activities with a high risk of sustaining a jammed finger, such as ball sports.

See also
 Broken finger

References 

Injuries of wrist and hand